Bánk bán is an opera in 3 acts by composer Ferenc Erkel. The work uses a Hungarian-language libretto by Béni Egressy which is based on a stage play of the same name by József Katona. (Bán is ban in English, similar to a viceroy, a duke or palatine.) The main storyline is based on the assassination of Queen Gertrude, wife of Andrew II in 1213. The opera was first performed at the Pesti Nemzeti Magyar Szinház in Pest on 9 March 1861.

Roles

Synopsis
Setting: Hungary in the year 1213

Act 1
King Endre II, the monarch of the country, is fighting abroad while Gertrude, his queen, who is of Meranian birth, plays hostess to the leading members of the Court (in the first place foreigners) at prodigal feasts. Bán Bánk, the king's deputy, is touring the poverty-ridden country while Otto, the Queen's younger brother, is trying to seduce Bánk's beautiful wife Melinda. A group of angry Magyar nobles headed by Bán Petur are plotting a conspiracy against the queen, anxious for the fate of their homeland and the honour of Bánk's wife. Petur has sent for Bánk, hoping to recruit him for their cause. The Bán arrives, but is outraged that his old friend would dare threaten the throne. When Petur informs him of Otto's advances toward Melinda, however, Bánk promises that he shall attend their meeting.

Act 2
Bánk, distraught, prays over his nation and his good name. On the porch of the castle of Visegrád, Tiborc, an old peasant, tells Bánk about the desperate poverty of the entire country, a grave consequence of the wasteful extravagance of the foreigners, but Bánk is so overcome by the tragedy of his own position that he listens only halfheartedly. It is revealed that Tiborc, a vassal of the Bán, saved his life at a battle long ago; Bánk promises his aid. Otto, encouraged by the Queen's open approval, attempts to seduce Melinda, without success. He drugs and rapes her. The desperate woman staggers to her husband half insane with shame. In his bitter grief Bánk blasts a terrible curse at his own son, but then raises to himself the innocent little boy, giving solace to his wife. Finally, he asks Tiborc to escort Melinda and their little son to their home, a castle in East Hungary, beyond the River Tisza.

In the throne-room Bánk calls the Queen to account for plunging the country into poverty and for the honour of his betrayed wife. Gertrude counters him with contemptuous scorn and draws a dagger. Bánk wrests the dagger from her hand, and in the scuffle, she is fatally stabbed. Bánk laments over the actions he has been forced to take.

Act 3
Tiborc reaches the bank of the Tisza River with Melinda and her little son. In a fit of insanity, Melinda throws herself into the waves together with her son, within view of the helpless old peasant.

Endre II returns. Standing by his queen's funeral bier, he calls to the nobles to account for the murder, who deny having had a part in the assault on the Queen. Bánk, however, admits that, convinced of her guilt which was known to all, he killed the Queen deliberately. King and Viceroy face each other with swords almost drawn when Tiborc arrives with the corpses of Melinda and the child. The sword drops from Bánk's grip, and he collapses over the bodies of his wife and son. The nobles and retainers pray for the repose of all the dead.

Recordings

References

External links
 

Operas set in Hungary
Operas by Ferenc Erkel
Hungarian-language operas
1861 operas
Operas based on plays
Operas set in the 13th century
Operas